Antidote is a studio album by Chick Corea and The Spanish Heart Band. The album received a Grammy Award for Best Latin Jazz Album at the 62nd Annual Grammy Awards. 

The album contains re-arranged versions of songs from Corea's My Spanish Heart and  Touchstone albums along with two newly written pieces (Antidote, Admiration) and three pieces from other composers, including Paco de Lucia's Zyryab. The recording sessions have been filmed by a crew for a film, produced by the Church of Scientology, "Chick Corea: In The Mind of a Master".

Track listing  
 "Antidote" - 9:14
 "Duende" - 10:13
 "The Yellow Nimbus" - Part 1 - 5:47
 "The Yellow Nimbus" - Part 2 - 5:57
 "Prelude To My Spanish Heart" - 1:11
 "My Spanish Heart" - 6:57
 "Armando’s Rhumba" - 8:02
 "Desafinado" - 5:03
 "Zyryab" - 11:55
 "Pas de Deux" - 1:40
 "Admiration" - 8:27

Personnel  
 Chick Corea - piano, keyboards, synthesizers
 Ruben Blades - vocals 
 Gayle Moran - vocals 
 Maria Bianca - vocals 
 Niño Josele - guitar
 Carlitos Del Puerto - bass guitar
 Jorge Pardo - flute, saxophone 
 Michael Rodriguez - trumpet
 Steve Davis - trombone 
 Marcus Gilmore - drums 
 Luisito Quintero - percussion 
 Nino De Los Reyes - tap dance

Production
 Chick Corea – producer 
 Gayle Moran – co-producer 
 Bernie Kirsh – co-producer 
 John Burk – executive producer
 Bernie Grundman – engineer (mastering)

References 

2019 albums
Chick Corea albums
Grammy Award for Best Latin Jazz Album